The Buhl AirSedan was a family of American civil cabin sesquiplane aircraft developed and manufactured by the Buhl Aircraft Company in the late 1920s. One example completed the first transcontinental non-stop roundtrip flight, made in 1929 by the CA-6 Spokane Sun-God, and the first Pope to have flown did so in a Buhl Airsedan.

Design and development
The Airsedan series were designed by Etienne Dormoy following the departure of Alfred V. Verville from Buhl, with whom he had worked previously. Dormoy had worked with Deperdussin before World War one, flew combat operations during the war before returning to work with SPAD, travelled to the US to coordinate production of SPADs with Curtiss until the project was cancelled with the end of the war. He then worked with Packard on automobiles for a year in 1919 before working as a civilian with the United States Army Air Corps with Verville, who convinced him to work at Buhl. As a Frenchman, he was familiar with the advantages of the sesquiplane concept as it was a popular configuration in France, such as with the Breguet 26T airliner, but rare in the US.

The fuselage framework, lower wing and empennage were welded chromium-molybdenum alloy steel tubes faired with wooden battens, with the lower wing integral with the fuselage structure. The upper wings were built around spruce spars, with built up ribs made from spruce and plywood. The entire airframe was covered with doped aircraft-grade fabric.
To reduce control forces, projecting aerodynamic balance horns on rudder and elevators, while inset aerodynamic horns were used on the ailerons, which were fitted to the upper wing only. To provide trim control, the rudder was ground adjustable while the elevators could be adjustable in flight. Depending on the models, three different designs of lower wings were used - either constant chord with reversed N struts on the CA-5, a triangular wing with a vee strut on the CA-3, CA-6 and CA-8, or a constant chord wing with two rigged struts, on Canadian built CA-6Ms.
All were conventional sesquiplanes with fully enclosed cockpits, fitted with dual controls in front of a passenger cabin. The number in the designation generally referred to the number of occupants as originally designed, with a larger number of seats corresponding to a larger airframe. 
The first variant built was the CA-5, while later variants had a much slimmer fuselage, a greatly improved windscreen design and a modified cockpit. The CA-5 had the undercarriage legs connected to the fuselage, and part way out from the fuselage, on the lower wing. The CA-3 had the undercarriage mounted solely to the fuselage, while the CA-6 and CA-8 had additional bracing struts from the top of the fuselage to the lower wing which allowed the undercarriage track to be widened. Buhl asserted that its undercarriage design reduced camber changes during landing, and the tendency to yaw due to bumpy ground. The CA-6 was certified to use Edo J-5300 floats.

Canadian production

After Buhl had ceased operations in 1932 due to declining sales as the Great Depression deepened, the drawings and jigs were purchased by the Ontario Provincial Air Service (OPAS) in Canada who then built four CA-6M's for use as fire spotting aircraft at their facility in Sault Ste. Marie between 1935 and 1937. These differed from the original aircraft in having Canadian Vickers floats, a new fin and rudder and larger lower wings. Due to the excessive weight of the Canadian-Vickers built floats, the first Ontario Provincial Air Service-built CA-6M refused to leave the water until given a more powerful  Pratt & Whitney Wasp engine.

Operational history

A CA-5 Airsedan NC2915, dubbed Miss Doran, and flown by Auggie Pedlar with V. P. Knope navigating, was one of the entrants in the disastrous August 1927 Dole Air Race and like many competitors, was lost at sea. Two other aviators lost their lives in a Swallow monoplane while searching for them. 

A CA-3C Sport Airsedan NC7448, named Angelino Jr was piloted by Loren Mendell to first place in the Oakland-Cleveland Air Derby during the 1929 National Air Races.

The Angeleno, CA-5A NR3763, also flown by Loren Mendell, along with R.B. Reinhart, set an endurance record of 246 hours, 43 minutes and 2 seconds on July 12th 1929 using inflight refuelling. They had just barely beaten the previous record when trash tossed from the aircraft jammed the tail and ended their run - and worse, their record would be bested within two weeks with a Curtiss Robin.

Another Airsedan, a CA-6 Special NC9628 named Spokane Sun God made the first nonstop round-trip crossing the United States by air. Nick Mamer and Art Walker flew from Spokane, Washington, to New York City and back beginning on August 15, 1929, taking 120 hours (five days) for the trip, using inflight refueling. They covered  and made eleven fuel transfers. That was not Mamer's only connection to the Airsedans, as his airlines operated five examples in addition to the record breaking aircraft. 

After having served as a technology demonstrator for Packard, the Packard DR-980 Diesel powered CA-3E NC8451 was re-engined with a Wright J-6 Whirlwind and exported to Argentina for use by Aeroposta Argentina in 1931. In 1934 it made a flight over Buenos Aires with Cardinal Monsignor Pacelli, shortly before he was elected as Pope Pius XII, becoming the first Pope to have made a flight in an aircraft.

After a career spent seeking out forest fires in the northern Ontario bush, as an airborne counterpart to fire lookout towers, the last of the Ontario Provincial Air Service CA-6Ms would be sold off to private operators in 1948. Their service predated the use of aircraft for directly extinguishing fires, so after spotting a fire, the Buhls would transport firemen to the fire, equipped with portable firefighting equipment, supplanting or replacing earlier types of aircraft such as the Curtiss HS-2L and Canadian Vickers Vedette. If this sounds laborious, aircraft replaced the canoes which had been used previously. 

After passing through a number of owners and undergoing unspecified modifications ostensibly for movie photography, CA-6 NC9629 was seized on 9 May 1933 while smuggling  of alcohol from Mexico during Prohibition near Fallbrook, California by the American Immigration and Naturalization Service while the alcohol was being transferred to a waiting Marmon coupe. Prohibition would end later that same year.

Lineas Aereas del Balsas imported one CA-6 which was based out of Morelia for a route running between Manzanillo and Mexico City, while Carlos Panini eventually imported four CA-6s into Mexico for his much more successful airline. Carlos was a recent immigrant from Italy, and having taken flying lessons, started an airline in 1934, running the Ruta del Balsas (Balsas Route), along the Balsas River (sometimes known as the Atoyac River), in Mexico. The river lacked any bridges for over 300 miles, and communities usually travelled back and forth by boat, however, during the flood season, this became extremely hazardous. This was sufficiently successful that he bought three additional Buhls, and eventually expanded into a major airline.

During the 1929 Escobar Rebellion when the Mexican government faced a large scale mutiny led by General José Gonzalo Escobar against the office of President going to a civilian, one of these Buhls was operated by the Fuerza Aérea Mexicana as a light utility transport with standard military red-white-green triangle markings. It is likely the sole example to have seen military service.

Variants

 CA-3 Airsedan (1928) -  wing span three-seater powered by a  Wright J-5 Whirlwind radial
CA-3A - conversion of CA-3
CA-3B Junior Airsedan -  Warner Scarab
CA-3C Sport Airsedan (ATC 46) -  Wright J-5 Whirlwind
CA-3CW Sport Airsedan (ATC 2-328) -  Pratt & Whitney Wasp
CA-3D Sport Airsedan  (ATC 163, 2-72) -  Wright J-6 Whirlwind
CA-3E Sport Airsedan (ATC 2-309) -  Packard DR-980

 CA-5 Airsedan (1927, ATC 12) -  wing span five-seater powered by a  Wright J-5 Whirlwind
 CA-5A Airsedan (ATC 33) - Deluxe version powered with a  Wright J-5 Whirlwind

 CA-6 Standard Airsedan (1929, ATC 128, 2-51) -  wing span six-seater powered by a  Wright J-6 Whirlwind
 CA-6 Special   -  Wright J-6 Whirlwind Spokane Sun God endurance aircraft
 CA-6A Airsedan -  Pratt & Whitney Wasp
 CA-6B Airsedan (ATC 2-225) -  Pratt & Whitney Wasp
 CA-6D Special - 2 converted from CA-3D as six seaters
 CA-6J Airsedan (ATC 2-336) -  Pratt & Whitney Wasp five seater (1 converted from CA-6)
 CA-6M Airsedan -  Pratt & Whitney Wasp powered Canadian-built CA-6 with local modifications. 4 built.
 CA-6W Airsedan (ATC 2-133) -  Pratt & Whitney Wasp four seater (1 converted from CA-6)

 CA-8 Senior Airsedan (1929 ATC 2-46) -  wing span eight-seater powered by a  Pratt & Whitney Wasp C
 CA-8A Senior Airsedan (ATC 98) -  Wright R-1750 Cyclone 9
 CA-8B Senior Airsedan (ATC 99) -  Pratt & Whitney R-1690 Hornet

Operators

Aeroposta Argentina - operated one CA-3D

Brooks Construction & Transportation/Brooks Airways - operated two CA-6s
Cherry Red Airline - operated one CA-6
National Air Transport - operated one CA-3C, one CA-5, and one CA-6
Ontario Provincial Air Service (OPAS) - operated four CA-6Ms

Lineas Aereas del Balsas operated one CA-6
Servicio Aéreo Panini operated four CA-6s
Fuerza Aérea Mexicana operated one CA-6 during the 1929 Escobar Rebellion

Central Airlines operated a CA-6B
Nick Mamer/Mamer Air Transport/Mamer Flying Service - operated one CA-3A, one CA-5A, three CA-6Bs and the CA-6 distance record aircraft
Various private operators.

Survivors and aircraft on display

NC5860: The first CA-3C was built in June 1928, and was raced in the 1928 National Air Tour with Buhl markings. It underwent a major restoration that was completed in 2011.
NC5861: The prototype CA-3, having been converted to a CA-3C, was bought back by the Buhl family in 2007 and restored to flying condition in 2012.
NC8451: A Packard DR-980 diesel powered CA-3 currently owned by the Golden Wings Museum in Blaine, Minnesota after having been restored from derelict condition as found in Argentina. This was the aircraft in which the first flight made by a Pope, Pius XII. Although painted as it was when it was a CA-3E, it is fitted with the Wright J-6 engine which it had when it was a CA-3D.
CF-OAR and CF-OAT: The unrestored remains from two OPAS Buhl CA-6Ms are on display as found, at the Canadian Bushplane Heritage Centre in Sault Ste. Marie, Ontario.

Specifications (CA-6 ATC# 128)

See also

 1927 in aviation
 Buhl CA-1 Airster
 Buhl Bull Pup

References

Citations

Bibliography

External links

 Colour video of Canadian Buhl in flight

Airsedan
1920s United States civil utility aircraft
Racing aircraft
Sesquiplanes
Single-engined tractor aircraft
High-wing aircraft
Aircraft first flown in 1927